The South Mowich Glacier is a glacier located on the western flank of Mount Rainier in Washington. After leaving the Amphitheater, there is an icefall on the glacier where it plunges down below . As the glacier nears Jeanette Heights, it passes by several turns and becomes very rocky in comparison to the upper sections of the glacier. Meltwater from the glacier drains into the South Mowich River which eventually merges with the Puyallup River.

See also
North Mowich Glacier
List of glaciers

References

Glaciers of Mount Rainier
Glaciers of Washington (state)